Lion Geyser is a cone-type geyser  in the Upper Geyser Basin of Yellowstone National Park in the United States. It is located in the Geyser Hill complex.

It was named for the roaring sound of steam releasing during an eruption. Eruptions can reach  and last from 1 to 7 minutes. Lion is the largest of the Lion Group which includes Little Cub Geyser and the currently inactive Big Cub and Lioness geysers.

References

Geysers of Wyoming
Geothermal features of Teton County, Wyoming
Geothermal features of Yellowstone National Park
Geysers of Teton County, Wyoming